Gerry Eastman Studds (May 12, 1937 – October 14, 2006) was an American Democratic Congressman from Massachusetts who served from 1973 until 1997. He was the first openly gay member of Congress. In 1983 he was censured by the House of Representatives after he admitted to what he described as a "consensual relationship" with a 17-year-old page.

Early life and career
Gerry Studds, born in Mineola, New York, was a descendant of Elbridge Gerry, who was the 9th governor of Massachusetts.  The son of Elbridge Gerry Eastman Studds (an architect who helped design the FDR Drive in New York City) and his wife, the former Beatrice Murphy, he had a brother, Colin Studds, and a sister, Gaynor Studds (Stewart). Studds attended elementary and middle school at Derby Academy.

He attended Yale University, receiving a bachelor's degree in history in 1959 and a master's degree in 1961. While at Yale, he was a member of St. Anthony Hall. Following graduation, Studds was a foreign service officer in the State Department and then an assistant in the Kennedy White House, where he worked to establish a domestic Peace Corps. Later, he became a teacher at St. Paul's School in Concord, New Hampshire. In 1968, he played a key role in U.S. Senator Eugene McCarthy's campaign in the New Hampshire presidential primary.

Career in the United States Congress
Studds made his first run for Congress in 1970, but lost to the incumbent Republican representative, Hastings Keith, in a close election. In 1972, with Keith not running for re-election, Studds won the 12th congressional district seat. He moved to the 10th district seat after redistricting in 1983.

Studds was a central figure in the 1983 congressional page sex scandal, when he and Representative Dan Crane were each separately censured by the House of Representatives for an inappropriate relationship with a congressional page — in Studds' case, a 1973 sexual relationship with a 17-year-old male. During the course of the House Ethics Committee's investigation, Studds publicly acknowledged his homosexuality, a disclosure that, according to a Washington Post article, "apparently was not news to many of his constituents." Studds stated in an address to the House, "It is not a simple task for any of us to meet adequately the obligations of either public or private life, let alone both, but these challenges are made substantially more complex when one is, as I am, both an elected public official and gay." He acknowledged that it had been inappropriate to engage in a relationship with a subordinate, and said his actions represented "a very serious error in judgment."

On July 20, 1983, the House voted to censure Studds, by a vote of 420–3. With his back to the other members, Studds faced the Speaker who was reading the motion. In addition to voting the censure, the Democratic leadership stripped Studds of his chairmanship of the House Merchant Marine Subcommittee. (Seven years later, in 1990, Studds was appointed chair of the House Committee on Merchant Marine and Fisheries.) Studds received two standing ovations from supporters in his home district at his first town meeting following his congressional censure.

Studds defended his sexual involvement as a "consensual relationship with a young adult." Dean Hara, whom Studds married in 2004, said after Studds' death in 2006 that Studds had never been ashamed of the relationship. "This young man knew what he was doing," Hara said. In testimony to investigators, the page described the relationship as consensual and not intimidating.

Although Studds said he disagreed with the committee's findings of improper sexual conduct, he waived his right to public hearings on the allegations in order to protect the privacy of those involved:

"...I have foremost in my mind the need to protect, to the extent it is still possible given the committee's action, the privacy of other individuals affected by these allegations," said Studds. "Those individuals have a right to personal privacy that would be inevitably and irremediably shattered if I were to insist on public hearings...."

Studds said that deciding not to have a hearing "presented me with the most difficult choice I have had to make in my life."

Studds was re-elected to the House six more times after the 1983 censure. He fought for many issues, including environmental and maritime issues, same-sex marriage, AIDS funding, and civil rights, particularly for gays and lesbians. Studds was an outspoken opponent of the Strategic Defense Initiative missile defense system, which he considered wasteful and ineffective, and he criticized the United States government's secretive support for the Contra fighters in Nicaragua.

Later years and death
After retiring from Congress in 1997, Studds worked as a lobbyist for the fishing industry. Studds previously worked for two years as executive director of the New Bedford Oceanarium, a facility still under development.

Studds and partner Dean T. Hara (his companion since 1991) were married in Boston on May 24, 2004, one week after Massachusetts became the first state in the country to legalize same-sex marriage.

The Gerry E. Studds Stellwagen Bank National Marine Sanctuary, which sits at the mouth of Massachusetts Bay, is named for Studds.

In 2006, the Mark Foley page scandal brought Studds's name into prominence again, as media pundits compared the actions of Foley and Congress in 2006 to Studds and Congress in 1983.

Studds died on October 14, 2006, in Boston, at age 69, several days after suffering a pulmonary embolism. Due to the federal ban on same-sex marriage, Hara was not eligible, upon Studds' death, to receive the pension provided to surviving spouses of former members of Congress. Hara later joined a federal lawsuit, Gill v. Office of Personnel Management, that successfully challenged the constitutionality of section 3 of the Defense of Marriage Act.

In a 2018 lawsuit, Studds was accused of sexual misconduct toward students at Saint Paul's School in Concord, NH, while he was a teacher there in the 1960s.

In August 2019, Studds was one of the honorees inducted in the Rainbow Honor Walk, a walk of fame in San Francisco's Castro neighborhood noting LGBTQ people who have "made significant contributions in their fields."

See also
 List of LGBT members of the United States Congress
 List of federal political sex scandals in the United States
 List of United States representatives expelled, censured, or reprimanded

References

Further reading
Johansson, Warren, & Percy, William A. Outing: Shattering the Conspiracy of Silence. Harrington Park Press, 1994. pp. 156–7

External links

GLBTQ Encyclopedia
"Page Program Has Seen Scandal Before", Liz Marlantes, ABC News, Sept. 29, 2006
Contributors to Studds' campaigns
His 'leadership changed Mass. forever' — The Boston Globe, October 15, 2006
Gerry Studds; Gay Pioneer in Congress — The Washington Post, October 15, 2006
Annoy.com Profile: Gerry Studds Video Interview
 

|-

|-

1937 births
2006 deaths
20th-century American politicians
Censured or reprimanded members of the United States House of Representatives
Deaths from pulmonary embolism
Democratic Party members of the United States House of Representatives from Massachusetts
Gay politicians
LGBT members of the United States Congress
LGBT people from Massachusetts
People from Mineola, New York
Yale University alumni
20th-century American LGBT people
St. Anthony Hall